William Henry "Bucky" Walters (April 19, 1909 – April 20, 1991) was an American professional baseball pitcher who played in Major League Baseball from 1931 to 1950. He was a six-time All-Star and the 1939 National League Most Valuable Player.  

Walters began his MLB career as a position player, and appeared in 184 games (177 started) as a third baseman before he converted to full-time pitcher. Over the course of his 19-year big-league career, he played for the Boston Braves (1931–32, 1950), Boston Red Sox (1933–34), Philadelphia Phillies (1934–1938) and Cincinnati Reds (1938–1948). Walters later became a major league manager and pitching coach.

Playing career

In his 16-season MLB pitching career, Walters posted a 198–160 won–lost record with 1,107 strikeouts and a 3.30 ERA in 3,104 innings and 428 appearances. He allowed 2,990 hits and 1,121 bases on balls, and posted a 1.34 WHIP. Walters threw 242 complete games and 42 shutouts during his career, and was 160–107 (2.93) in 312 games as a member of the Reds.

Walters broke into the majors as a third baseman for the Boston Braves in 1931. After two seasons, he failed with the Braves (hitting only .191 in 32 total games). But in 1933, he hit .376 in the Pacific Coast League to earn a shot with the Boston Red Sox of the American League, where he batted .244 with eight home runs in 75 games between July 19, 1933, and May 18, 1934.

It was not until Walters was purchased by the Philadelphia Phillies from the Red Sox on June 14, 1934—and he was 25 years old—that he converted to pitching. After getting into 83 games as an infielder (80 at third base) for the Phils, he made his mound debut September 24 by tossing two innings of hitless relief against the Brooklyn Dodgers. He got his first MLB start six days later against the Braves, and allowed one unearned run in five innings. Then, in 1935, Walters pitched in 24 games, with 22 starts, and notched nine victories. He became a sinker-ball specialist, and after winning 14 games (for a Phillies team that won only 61 contests all year) and leading the National League with 34 starts in 1937, he was traded to the Cincinnati Reds on June 13, 1938.

In 1939 and 1940, Walters helped the Reds win two straight National League pennants, in each season leading NL pitchers in wins, ERA, complete games and innings pitched. His most productive season came in 1939, when he won the Triple Crown with 27 victories, a 2.29 ERA, and 137 strikeouts (tied with Claude Passeau). For his performance, Walters garnered Most Valuable Player honors, the second of three straight Cincinnati players to win the award (Ernie Lombardi and Frank McCormick were the others). In 1940, Walters won 22 games and posted a 2.48 ERA.

When the Yankees swept the Reds in four games In the 1939 World Series, Walters started and lost Game 2 and was the loser in relief of the final game. Nevertheless, in the 1940 Series, facing Detroit, Walters gave the National League its first Series game victory since 1937 with a three-hitter in Game 2. Four days later, he evened the Series for the Reds in Game 6 with a five-hit shutout. He also became the first pitcher in 14 years to hit a home run in the Series. In Game 7, the Reds won the second world championship of their modern (post-1900) history.

In 1944, Walters posted a league-high 23 wins while losing only 8, and compiled a 2.40 ERA. 

An excellent hitting pitcher in his major league career, Walters posted a .243 batting average (477-for-1966) with 227 runs, 23 home runs and 234 RBI. Like fellow pitcher Wes Ferrell, Walters was occasionally used as a pinch hitter during the 1940s.

Manager and coach
He was named manager of the Reds on August 6, 1948, his last year as active player for Cincinnati, taking over from Johnny Neun. At the time, the club was 44–56 (.440) and seventh in the eight-team National League. Walters led the Reds to a 20–33 (.377) mark, still in seventh place but only one-half game from the league cellar. Retained for 1949, his Reds were 61–90 (.404) on September 27, again lodged in seventh place and 34 games out of first, when Walters was replaced by Luke Sewell at the club's helm. As a manager, he had an 81–123 (.397) record. 

He briefly returned to pitching in 1950, and made a four-inning relief appearance with the Braves, for whom he was the full-time pitching coach.

Walters coached for the Braves (in Boston from 1950–1952, and in Milwaukee from 1953–1955) and New York Giants (1956–1957). He took a leave of absence from his Boston Braves' coaching tenure on June 6, 1952, to serve as the interim manager of the last minor league edition of the Milwaukee Brewers through the end of that season. The 1952 Brewers won 101 regular-season games, but fell in the finals of the American Association playoffs. Walters then was reappointed the Braves' pitching coach for 1953, with the franchise transferring to Milwaukee during spring training on March 18.

He was inducted into the Cincinnati Reds Hall of Fame in 1958.

Bucky Walters died in Abington, Pennsylvania, one day after his 82nd birthday.

In August 2008, he was named as one of the ten former players that began their careers before 1943 to be considered by the Veterans Committee for induction into the National Baseball Hall of Fame in 2009.

See also

 Baseball Hall of Fame balloting, 2009
 Major League Baseball Triple Crown
 List of Major League Baseball annual ERA leaders
 List of Major League Baseball annual strikeout leaders
 List of Major League Baseball annual wins leaders
 List of Major League Baseball annual wins leaders
 List of Major League Baseball player-managers

References

 Honig, Donald (1975) Baseball When the Grass Was Real: Baseball from the Twenties to the Forties Told by the Men Who Played It. New York: Coward, McGann & Geoghegan. pp. 86–99. .

External links

1909 births
1991 deaths
Baseball players from Philadelphia
Boston Braves coaches
Boston Braves players
Boston Red Sox players
Cincinnati Reds managers
Cincinnati Reds players
High Point Pointers players
Major League Baseball pitchers
Major League Baseball pitching coaches
Major League Baseball player-managers
Milwaukee Braves coaches
Milwaukee Brewers (minor league) managers
Mission Reds players
Montreal Royals players
Nashville Vols players
National League All-Stars
National League ERA champions
National League Most Valuable Player Award winners
National League Pitching Triple Crown winners
National League strikeout champions
National League wins champions
New York Giants (NL) coaches
Philadelphia Phillies players
Portland Mariners players
Providence Grays (minor league) players
Williamsport Grays players